Michael George Hartwell MacDowel (13 September 1932 – 19 January 2016) was an English racing driver who participated in one Formula One World Championship Grand Prix, the 1957 French Grand Prix on 7 July 1957, sharing his car with Jack Brabham. MacDowel did not score any championship points as he finished seventh (having qualified 15th and last), and points were only awarded to the first five finishers.

MacDowel was a keen amateur racer. After a break, he competed in hill climb events from 1968 until well after his 60th birthday. He set what was then the course record at Shelsley Walsh in 1973 – 28.21 seconds for the 1000 yard course – and in both that season and the following year he won the British Hill Climb Championship.

He died on 19 January 2016.

Racing record

Complete Formula One World Championship results
(key)

* Indicates shared drive with Jack Brabham

Complete British Saloon Car Championship results
(key) (Races in bold indicate pole position; races in italics indicate fastest lap.)

External links
Profile at Grand Prix Racing
Profile at oldracingcars.com

English racing drivers
English Formula One drivers
Cooper Formula One drivers
British hillclimb drivers
1932 births
2016 deaths
Sportspeople from Great Yarmouth
British Touring Car Championship drivers